Natalie Cressman is an American jazz trombonist and vocalist.

Career
Cressman was born in San Francisco to  jazz musicians Sandy and Jeff Cressman. When her father was part of Carlos Santana's band, she danced onstage with him at Madison Square Garden. In her early teens she began performing with Afro Cuban, Brazilian, and jazz bands. Cressman graduated from San Francisco's Ruth Asawa School of the Arts. At the age of eighteen she moved to New York City to attend the Manhattan School of Music, where she studied with Luis Bonilla, Garry Dial, Laurie Frink, and Wycliffe Gordon. She joined a band led by Trey Anastasio. She performed with Nicholas Payton's Television Symphony Orchestra and Peter Apfelbaum's New York Hieroglyphics Ensemble. In 2012 she played the Apollo Theater as a soloist in Wycliffe Gordon's Jazz a la Carte. She founded the band Secret Garden. She has appeared with the bands Dumpstaphunk and Lettuce and has been an artist at large at Bear Creek Music Festival.

References

External links
 
 Audio interview
 Interview at The Sound podcast

Date of birth missing (living people)
Year of birth missing (living people)
Living people
Musicians from San Francisco
20th-century births
21st-century American musicians
21st-century American women musicians
21st-century trombonists
American trombonists
Women trombonists